Family Magazine is a weekly women's magazine published from Lahore, Punjab, Pakistan. It provides news concerning women health, beauty, fashion and jewellery. It is part of the Nawa e waqt newspaper group of Pakistan.

References

External links
 Family magazine's official website

Mass media in Lahore
Women's magazines published in Pakistan
Weekly magazines published in Pakistan
Urdu-language magazines
Magazines with year of establishment missing